R2D3 (stylized as R2*D3) is a Brazilian pop band formed in 2009, consisting of Brendha Lu, Davi Moraes, Roberta Mitidieri and Dodô Teixeira. The band was put together by Natália Subtil and produced by Güido Laris.

History
The band was formed on April 4, 2009, by Natália Subtil with the mission to bring joy, fun and pop his followers. Later that year the band went to Mexico to record their first album, Nasci Pra Te Amar. The band was produced by Güido Laris, who also produced music for the bands RBD, OV7, Timbiriche and singer Belinda. The album contains tracks like "Talk Talk", "On My Way" and "Here". The band was featured on several Mexican TV shows and their music also gained airplay in the country.

Members

References

Brazilian musical groups